The Ministry of Environment and Sustainable Development is the national executive ministry of the Government of Colombia in charge of formulating, implementing, and orienting environmental policy to ensure the sustainable development of the country.

References

 
Colombia, Environment and Sustainable Development
Environmental policies organizations
Colombia